The Messe für den Gründonnerstag (Mass for Maundy Thursday), WAB 9, is a missa brevis composed by Anton Bruckner in 1844.

History 
Bruckner dedicated the work to A.M.D.G.

The work, the manuscript of which is stored in the archive of Wels, was first published in band I, pp. 258–274 of the Göllerich/Auer biography. Thereafter, only the Gradual Christus factus est was issued by Anton Böhm & Sohn in 1931, so that the work was listed by Grasberger as Christus factus est, WAB 9.

Setting 
The work is divided into six parts:
 Gradual Christus factus est, F major
 Credo, C major
 Offertory Dextera Domini, F major
 Sanctus, E major
 Benedictus, G major
 Agnus Dei, F major
Total duration: about 10 minutes.

On the front page of Bruckner's manuscript is written: 
Vierstimmige Choral-Messe ohne Kyrie und Gloria für den Gründonnerstag 
auch mit fug[iertem] Kyr[ie] und Glor[ia] [1]845 comp[oniert] 
A.M.D.G. comp[oniert] [1]844, Anton Bruckner
In front of page 3 of the manuscript is written  (At the Last Supper)

This Missa brevis exhibits as the previous Kronstorfer Messe relationships to Palestrina's style. It contained originally no Kyrie or Gloria, but included the Gradual Christus factus est and the Offertory Dextera Domini proper for the feast. Only the first part of the Credo is composed, until "descendit de caelis". The Sanctus is a slightly modified version of the Sanctus of the Kronstorfer Messe.

As also in the following Missa solemnis, Mass No. 1 and Mass No. 2 the first verse of the Credo is not composed and has to be intoned by the priest in Gregorian mode before the choir is going on.

The extra fugated Kyrie and Gloria, which were composed in 1845, have been lost.

Text 
The text of Dextera Domini is derived from Psalm 117 in the Vulgata.
{|
|
|style="padding-left:2em;"|The right hand of the Lord hath wrought strength;
The right hand of the Lord has exalted me.
I shall not die, but live, and declare the works of the Lord.
|}

Use in the modern liturgy 
To make the Messe für den Gründonnerstag usable for Eucharist celebration 
 Joseph Messner revised in 1941 the existing movements, and created a Kyrie and a Gloria, by using elements of the Gradual and the Offertory, and organ accompaniment ad libitum.
 Michael Stenov composed in 2018 a Kyrie and a Gloria, and completed the Credo fragment in Bruckner style. This completion was premiered in the Carmelite church of Linz during the Palm Sunday and Maundy Thursday celebrations.

Discography

Original setting 
There is a single recording of the entire original setting of the Mass:
Rupert Gottfried Frieberger, Vokalensemble der Stiftsmusik Schlägl, Anton Bruckner – Kirchenmusikalische Werke – Fabian Records CD 5115,

Messner's arrangement 
 Joseph Pančik, Prager Kammerchor, Josef Kšica (organ), Anton Bruckner – Motetten / Choral-Messe – CD Orfeo C 327 951 A, 1993

References

Sources 
 August Göllerich, Anton Bruckner. Ein Lebens- und Schaffens-Bild,  – posthumous edited by Max Auer by G. Bosse, Regensburg, 1932
 Anton Bruckner – Sämtliche Werke, Band XXI: Kleine Kirchenmusikwerke, Musikwissenschaftlicher Verlag der Internationalen Bruckner-Gesellschaft, Hans Bauernfeind and Leopold Nowak (Editor), Vienna, 1984/2001
 Max Auer, Anton Bruckner. Sein Leben und Werk. Amalthea-Verlag, Vienna, c. 1950
 Robert Haas, Anton Bruckner, 2nd print (Reprint der Ausgabe Athenaion, Potsdam, 1934), Laaber Verlag, Regensburg, 1980. 
 Uwe Harten, Anton Bruckner. Ein Handbuch. , Salzburg, 1996. .
 James Garrat, Palestrina and the German Romantic Imagination, Cambridge University Press, Cambridge, 2004. 
 John Williamson, The Cambridge Companion to Bruckner, Cambridge University Press, Cambridge, 2004. 
 Cornelis van Zwol, Anton Bruckner – Leven en Werken, Uit. Thot, Bussum, NL, 2012.

External links 
 
Choralmesse / Messe für den Gründonnerstag Christus factus est, F-Dur, WAB 9 Critical discography by Hans Roelofs  
Smaller sacred works (1835–1892) Gesamtausgabe – Volume XXI
 A live performance (Palm Sunday and Maundy Thursday, 2018) by Michael Stenov with the Cantores Carmeli, Linz, can be heard on YouTube:
Anton Bruckner - Messe für den Gründonnerstag, WAB 9 - original setting with lost Kyrie and Gloria, and incomplete parts of the Credo composed by Michael StenovNB: 

Masses by Anton Bruckner
1844 compositions
Compositions in F major